Mathew Nabwiso, often as Matthew Nabwiso is a Ugandan actor. Nabwiso is best known for the roles in the films Imbabazi, Rain and Kyaddala. Apart from acting, he is also a singer, director and producer.

Personal life
He was born as the seventh child of the family which includes eleven siblings. His parents are former parliamentarian Frank Nabwiso and Mama Christine Nabwiso of Jinja. He attended Mwiri and Kamuli Boys primary schools for primary education. Then he attended Busoga College, Mwiri for his O-level and later attended to Namasagali College, in Kamuli to complete A-level. He later obtained a bachelor's degree in marketing from Cyprus Institute of Marketing.

Before entering acting, he had a full-time job as the sales manager of an ICT company. But he quit the job to pursue a career through cinema.

He is married to fellow actress, Eleanor Nabwiso who also starred in the TV series The Hostel. The couple has four children.

Career
In 2006, he made the maiden cinema acting with the film Battle of the Souls.

In 2011, he joined the cast of televisions series The Hostel aired on NTV Uganda, which became highly popular. After the conclusion of the series, he founded the film production company 'Nabwiso Films'.

In 2013, he won the award for the Best Actor at Africa Magic Viewers' Choice Awards (AMVCA), for the film A Good Catholic Girl. Later in 2016, he was nominated for the role 'Dumba' in the film Rain at AMVCA. In 2020, he received Film Act Award at the Vine Awards for his contribution to the Ugandan cinema.

Filmography

References

External links
 

Living people
Ugandan film directors
Year of birth missing (living people)
Ugandan film producers
Ugandan actors
Ugandan film actors